The 2020 Connecticut State Senate election took place on November 3, 2020. Part of the biennial 2020 United States elections. Connecticut voters elected senators in all of the 36 State Senate districts. State senators serve two-year terms in the Connecticut State Senate, with all 36 of the seats up for election each cycle. The Primary Elections on August 11, 2020, determined which candidates appeared on the ballot for the general election. Four primary elections were cancelled, including three Republican primary elections. As a result, four Incumbent candidates ran uncontested.

Predictions

Results 

Two seats flipped from Republican to Democratic, resulting in a Democratic majority of 24–12 in the Senate chamber. Making the 2020 election the second election in a row where the Democratic majority increased. Republicans have now lost 6 seats in the past 2 elections. 1 Senator, Len Fasano (R-34th), did not attempt to run for re-election.

Composition

Overview

District 1 
Incumbent Democratic Senator John Fonfara has represented  Connecticut's 1st State Senate District since 1997. He won re-election against Republican Barbara Ruhe and Green Party candidate Mary L. Sanders.

District 2 
After the Republican primary was cancelled, Democratic Incumbent Douglas McCroy won re-election to a third term uncontested. This was the 2nd election in a row that McCroy ran uncontested. McCroy has represented the 2nd District since 2017.

District 3 
Democratic Incumbent Saud Anwar cruised to re-election for a 2nd term after the Republican primary was cancelled. Anwar has represented the 2nd District since 2019. Anwar also received the nomination from the Working Families Party.

District 4 
Incumbent Democrat Steve Cassano won re-election to a sixth term over Republican challenger Matthew M. Corey, Libertarian challenger Harold S. Harris, and Kelly Green from the Reclaim party. Cassano has represented the 4th District since 2011. Cassano also received the nomination from the Working Families Party.

District 5 
Democratic Incumbent Derek Slap won re-election to a 2nd term over Republican challenger Phillip Chabot and Independent challenger Joelle Nawrocki. Slap has represented the 5th District since 2019

District 6 
Democratic newcomer and State Representative Rick Lopes defeated Republican Incumbent Gennaro Bizzarro and helped increase the Democratic majority. Bizzaro has represented the 6th District since 2019. Rick Lopes also received the nomination from the Working Families Party.

District 7 
Republican Incumbent John A. Kissel won re-election to a 15th term after defeating Democratic newcomer Frederick A. Moffa. Kissel has represented the 7th District since 1993. Kissel also received the nomination of the Independent Party.While Moffa also received the nomination of the Working Families Party.

District 8 
Republican Incumbent Kevin Witkos won re-election to a seventh term after defeating Democratic newcomer Mellisa E. Osborne as well as Independent candidate Keith James McConnell. Witkos has represented the 8th District since 2009.

District 9 
Democratic Incumbent Matt Lesser won re-election to a 2nd term after defeating Republican challenger Richie Ruglio. Lesser has represented the 9th District since 2019.Richie Ruglio also received the nomination of the Independent Party. While Matt Lesser received the nomination of the Working Families Party.

District 10 
Democratic Incumbent Gary Winfield won re-election to a third term after defeating Republican challenger Carlos M. Alvarado in a landslide victory. Winfield has represented the 10th District since 2017. Winfield also received the nomination of the Working Families Party.

District 11 
Democratic Incumbent and President pro tempore Martin Looney won re-election to a 15th term after defeating Republican challenger Jameson White and Petitioning candidate Alexander Taubes in a landslide victory. Looney has represented the 11th District since 1993.

District 12 
Democratic Incumbent Christine Cohen won re-election to a 2nd term after defeating Republican challenger Joe LaPorta. Cohen has represented the 12th District since 2019.Cohen also received the nomination of the Independent Party as well as the Working Families Party.

District 13 
Democratic Incumbent Mary Abrams won re-election to a 2nd term after defeating Republican challenger Len Suzio. Abrams has represented the 13th District since 2019.Abrams also received the nomination of the Working Families Party.While Len Suzio also received the nomination of the Independent Party.

District 14 
Democratic Incumbent James Maroney won re-election to a 2nd term after defeating Republican challenger Michael Southworth. Maroney has represented the 14th District since 2019. Maroney also received the nomination of the Independent and Working Families Party.

District 15 
Democratic Incumbent Joan V. Hartley won an uncontested re-election resulting in his eleventh term, since the Republican primary was cancelled. Hartley has represented the 15th District since 2001. Hartley also received the nomination of the Independent Party.

District 16 
Republican Incumbent Rob Sampson won re-election to a second term over Democratic challenger Jack Perry. Write in candidate Paul J. Small received 4 votes. Sampson has represented the 16th District since 2019.Jack Perry also received the nomination of the Independent Party. As well as the Working Families Party.

District 17 
Democratic newcomer Jorge Cabrera defeated Republican Incumbent George Logan. Logan had represented the 17th District since 2017. The 17th District seat is one of two that flipped from Republican to Democrat. Logan also received the nomination of the Independent Party, while Jorge Cabrera received the nomination of the Working Families Party.

District 18 
Incumbent Republican Heather Somers won re-election to a third term over Democratic newcomer Bob Statchen. Somers has represented the 18th District since 2017. Statchen also received the nomination from the Independent and Working Families Parties.

District 19 
Democratic Incumbent Cathy Osten won re-election to a fifth term after defeating Republican challenger Steve Weir as well as Libertarian candidate William H. Russell. Osten has represented the 19th District since 2013.Osten also received the nomination of the Working Families Party.

District 20 
Republican Incumbent Paul Formica won re-election to a fourth term after narrowly beating out Democratic challenger Martha Marx in a close election. Formica has represented the 20th District since 2015.Marx also received the nomination of the Independent Party.

District 21 
Republican Incumbent Kevin C. Kelly won re-election to a sixth term uncontested after the Democratic primary was cancelled. Kelly has represented the 21st District since 2011.

District 22 
Democratic Incumbent Marilyn Moore won re-election to a fourth term against Republican challenger Steven S. Choi as well as Libertarian candidate Stephen Dincher. Moore has represented the 22nd District since 2015.

District 23 
Incumbent Democrat Dennis Bradley won re-election for a 2nd term after defeating Republican challenger Josiah Israel in a landslide victory. Bradley has represented the 23rd District since 2019.

District 24 
Democratic Incumbent Julie Kushner won re-election to a 2nd term over Republican challenger Susan Chapman. Kushner has represented the 24th District since 2019.Kushner also received the nomination of the Working Families Party. While Chapman also received the nomination of the Independent Party.

District 25 
Senate Majority leader Bob Duff won re-election to a 9th term over Republican challenger Ellie Kousidis. Duff has represented the 25th District since 2005.Kousidis also received the nomination of the Independent Party.

District 26 
Incumbent Democratic senator Will Haskell won re-election to a 2nd term against Republican candidate Kim Healy. Haskell has represented the 26th District since 2019.Healy also received the nomination of the Independent Party.

District 27 
Incumbent Democratic senator Carlo Leone won re-election to a sixth term after defeating Republican challenger Eva Maldonado. Leone has represented the 27th District since 2011.Maldonado also received the nomination of the Independent Party. Carlo Leone would eventually resign to take a job with the Lamont administration.

District 28 
Incumbent Republican Tony Hwang won re-election to a fourth term after beating out Democratic challenger Michelle Lapine McCabe and won re-election. Hwang has represented the 28th District since 2015.

District 29 
Democratic Incumbent Mae Flexer won re-election to a fourth term after defeating Republican/Independent challenger Jessica Alba. Flexer has represented the 29th District since 2015. Flexer also received the nomination of the Working Families Party. While Jessica Alba also received the nomination of the Independent Party.

District 30 
Republican Incumbent Craig Miner won re-election to a fourth term after defeating Democratic challenger David Gronbach as well as Independent Joseph Bongiorno. Miner has represented the 30th District since 2015.

District 31 
Republican Incumbent Henri Martin won re-election to a fourth term after defeating Democratic challenger Mary Fortier. Martin has represented the 31st District since 2015.

District 32 
Incumbent Republican Eric Berthel won re-election to a third term over Democratic challenger Jeff Desmarais. Berthel has represented the 32nd District since 2017.

District 33 
Incumbent Democrat Norm Needleman won re-election to a 2nd term after beating out Republican challenger Brendan Saunders to get re-elected. Needleman has represented the 33rd District since 2019.

District 34 
Newcomer Republican Paul Cicarella Jr. defeated Democratic challenger April Capone. The winner of this election, Paul Cicarella Jr., will replace retiring Senate Minority leader and former president pro tempore, Len Fasano.

District 35 
Republican Incumbent Dan Champagne won re-election to a 2nd term after beating out Democratic challenger Lisa Thomas. Champagne has represented the 35th District since 2019. Thomas also received the nomination of the Independent and Working Families Parties.

District 36 
Democratic Incumbent Alex Kasser narrowly defeated Republican challenger Ryan Fazio to win re-election to a 2nd term in a tight race. Kasser has represented the 36th District since 2019.

See also 
 2020 United States presidential election in Connecticut
 2020 United States House of Representatives elections in Connecticut

Notes

References

External links 
 Unofficial results
 

State Senate
2020
Connecticut State Senate